Hasur could refer to the following:

Hasur, Iran, a village in Isfahan Province, Iran
Hasur, Maharashtra, a village in India
Hasur, Syria, a village in Homs Governorate, Syria